Michael Hoecht (born October 5, 1997) is a Canadian American football outside linebacker for the Los Angeles Rams of the National Football League (NFL). He played college football at Brown.

Early life and high school
Hoecht was born in Oakville, Ontario and lived there until his family moved to Dayton, Ohio when he was four years old. His family moved back to Canada shortly before he started high school and lived in Stittsville for two years, then Toronto (North Toronto Collegiate Institute), before returning to Ohio and settling in Oakwood, Ohio, where he attended Oakwood High School.

College career
Hoecht played for the Brown Bears for four seasons. He was named second-team All-Ivy League as a senior after finishing the season with 42 tackles, nine tackles for a loss, and four sacks. Hoecht finished his collegiate career with 174 tackles, 29.5 tackles for loss, and 16.5 sacks with two forced fumbles and four fumble recoveries in 37 games played.

Professional career
Hoecht was signed by the Los Angeles Rams as an undrafted free agent following the 2020 NFL Draft on April 26, 2020. He was also selected by the Ottawa Redblacks in the second round of the 2020 CFL Draft. Hoecht was waived on September 4, 2020, during final roster cuts, and was subsequently signed to the team's practice squad one day later. Hoecht signed a reserve/futures contract with the team on January 18, 2021. Hoecht made the Rams' 53-man roster out of training camp to start the 2021 season. Hoecht played in all 17 regular season with three starts and had seven tackles. He also played in all four of the Rams' postseason games, including the team's 23-20 win over the Cincinnati Bengals in Super Bowl LVI.

On March 15, 2023, Hoecht was tendered by the Los Angeles Rams.

References

External links
 Brown Bears bio
 Los Angeles Rams bio

1997 births
Living people
American football defensive tackles
Los Angeles Rams players
Players of American football from Ohio
Brown Bears football players
Canadian players of American football